Tom Van Laere (born 1975), better known by his stage name Admiral Freebee, is a Belgian singer-songwriter. He took his stage name from the Jack Kerouac novel On the Road. Admiral Freebee is also the name of a ship that sank in San Francisco Bay and was subsequently used as a buoy. Tom Van Laere is the brother of Tim Van Laere, founder of Tim Van Laere Gallery. The gallery represents Adrian Ghenie, Kati Heck, Rinus Van de Velde, Jonathan Meese, Ben Sledsens and Franz West among others.

History
Van Laere was born in Brasschaat, near Antwerp. He participated in Humo's Rock Rally, one of the biggest rock competitions in the Low Countries. Backed by a bass guitarist and a drummer he was awarded the silver medal and won the audience's vote. His first album, Admiral Freebee, appeared soon after the competition on Universal, as did his second, Songs.

His third album, Wild Dreams of New Beginnings, has been released to positive critical acclaim in November 2006 and reached the top 40 on the Belgium charts.

Recently one of Belgium's most influential rock formations, dEUS, asked Admiral Freebee to be the supporting act on their European tour.
In June 2009 Admiral Freebee was the support act for Neil Young on several European tour dates.

Discography

The Admiral Freebee Freighter
According to Jack Kerouac in On the Road, Admiral Freebee is also the name of a ship that sank in San Francisco Bay and was subsequently used as a buoy.
"There was an old rusty freighter that was out in the bay that was used as a buoy." Jack Kerouac – On The Road – Part I – Chapter 11 – Page 73 – Penguin Books – 1976.

"And I never spent the night on the old ghost ship- the Admiral Freebee it was called..." Jack Kerouac – On The Road – Part I – Chapter 12 – Page 80 – Penguin Books – 1976.

References

External links
Admiral Freebee Info Site

1974 births
Living people
Belgian rock singers
Belgian male guitarists
Belgian rock guitarists
Belgian male singer-songwriters
People from Brasschaat
English-language singers from Belgium
21st-century Belgian male singers
21st-century Belgian singers
21st-century guitarists